Blazing Guns is a 1935 American Western film directed by Ray Heinz and starring Reb Russell, Marion Shilling and Lafe McKee. It was shot at the Iverson Ranch outside Los Angeles. A Poverty Row B western, it was distributed individually in separate states by a variety of companies.

Cast
 Reb Russell as Bob Grady
 Marion Shilling as Betty Lou Rickard
 Lafe McKee as John Rickard
 Joseph W. Girard as Sheriff Crabtree
 Frank McCarroll as Slug Raton posing as Duke Craven
 Slim Whitaker as Deputy Carter 
 Rebel as Rebel - Bob's Horse
 Gene Alsace as Gene, Henchman 
 Hank Bell as Sam, Vigilante

References

Bibliography
 Pitts, Michael R. Poverty Row Studios, 1929-1940. McFarland & Company, 2005.

External links
 

1935 films
1935 Western (genre) films
1930s English-language films
American Western (genre) films
Films directed by Ray Heinz
1930s American films